Paul Desbaillets is a Canadian entrepreneur, restaurateur, syndicator, and media personality. He is considered an important figure in the development of some of the most popular establishments in Montréal and is also well known in the Canadian professional football media scene.

Biography

Early life 

Desbaillets is the grandson of French Canadian radio and television personality Jacques DesBaillets. He got his start in the restaurateur business when he was 18 years old as a busboy.

Career 

As a co-founder and partner in the Burgundy Lion Group, Desbaillets is behind some of the most popular establishments in Montréal. His first venture, Burgundy Lion, opened in 2008 and redefined the public perception of what a pub in Montréal could be. It became known for its simple but impressive wine and cocktail list and a level of service that had not yet been seen in Montréal's pub culture. The Lion was able to maintain the balance or exceptional food and service while remaining a pub at its core. In 2010, Burgundy Lion Group expanded and opened the first Quebec inspired Fish n’ Chips shop in the world, the now renowned Brit & Chips. They have since added Pub Bishop & Bagg, Wolf & Workman gastropub, and RBHC Catering to their business portfolio. Desbaillets is also a member of the Nouvelle Association des Bars du Québec.

Desbaillets is the host and creator of the 1st Half Podcast, a podcast dedicated to all aspects of the game of football (soccer). During the COVID-19 pandemic, he was the host of the official MLS CF Montréal podcast and also produced a few 'Football & Food' shorts for the American group ONE37, Gary Vaynerchuk's digital media company. Recently, he became the football culture editor of Cult MTL, an arts, culture, and news website and print publication based in Montréal.

Philanthropy 

The year after the football-screening Burgundy Lion opened, Desbaillets started the GOAL Tournament, now known as Goal MTL. Goal MTL is a charity football tournament organized yearly that features a who’s who of Montreal’s bar, restaurant, and hospitality scene. Since its beginnings in 2010, the football tournament has raised more than $350,000 for local charities that run youth-oriented programs.

Purpose-driven and looking to give back to his community, Desbaillets then founded the GOAL Initiatives Foundation in 2019, a national Canada Revenue Agency charity making a difference through cultural development, mental health & wellness, and youth sports programming. GOAL Initiatives promotes mental health and wellness through play, and believes that no matter your age, race, gender, or sexual orientation you should have access to a safe space to play sports. GOAL Initiatives have created and hosted many events and experiences with the purpose of giving back to communities in need by funding youth sports and equipping children and teens with the tools they need to succeed both on and off the field.

In 2012, Desbaillets was the recipient of a Queen Elizabeth II Diamond Jubilee Medal. The Canadian medal, which is to honour significant contributions and achievements by Canadians, was awarded to 60,000 citizens and permanent residents of Canada who made a significant contribution to their fellow countrymen, their community, or to Canada over the previous sixty years.

Desbaillets has also consulted on football projects in the past with Labatt Brewing Company, Carlsberg, Molson, Ricardo Cavolo, Secret Walls, MURAL Festival, and Paris Saint-Germain F.C.

References

External links
Instagram

Canadian male journalists
Canadian podcasters
Canadian media personalities
Canadian restaurateurs
Concordia University alumni
Living people
Year of birth missing (living people)